1947 in philosophy

Events

Publications 
 Alan Watts, Behold the Spirit (1947)
 Max Horkheimer and Theodor W. Adorno, Dialectic of Enlightenment (1947)
 Max Horkheimer, The Eclipse of Reason (1947)
 P. D. Ouspensky, In Search of the Miraculous (1947)
 Rudolf Carnap, Meaning and Necessity (1947)
 Jean-Paul Sartre, What Is Literature? (1947)

Births 
 January 14 - Wlodek Rabinowicz 
 January 24 - Susan Bordo 
 February 7 - Peter Blokhuis 
 February 20 - Philip Kitcher 
 February 20 - Leonardo Moledo (died 2014)
 February 21 - Nanda Thein Zan (died 2011)
 February 22 - Frank Van Dun 
 February 25 - Marc Sautet (died 1998)
 March 2 - Yuri Matiyasevich 
 March 13 - Sayyid Al-Qemany 
 March 26 - Subhash Kak 
 March 27 - Daniel M. Hausman 
 April 1 - Nadežda Čačinovič 
 April 2 - Camille Paglia 
 April 21 - Terence Irwin 
 April 25 - Timo Airaksinen 
 May 6 - Martha Nussbaum 
 May 12 - Michael Ignatieff 
 May 20 - Nancy Fraser 
 May 29 - Goran Švob (died 2013)
 June 10 - Geydar Dzhemal (died 2016)
 June 19 - John Ralston Saul 
 June 21 - Fernando Savater 
 June 22 - Bruno Latour 
 June 26 - Peter Sloterdijk 
 July 6 - Michael Williams 
 July 26 - Steven Tainer 
 August 28 - Jens Staubrand 
 September 8 - Rémi Brague 
 September 10 - Karen J. Warren 
 September 20 - Gillian Rose (died 1995)
 September 29 - Ülo Kaevats (died 2015)
 October 24 - Barbara Cassin 
 November 7 - Günter Abel 
 November 21 - David Gooding (died 2009)

Unspecified Birth Dates 
 Gordon Anderson (unknown)
 Karl Ameriks (unknown)
 Thomas Baldwin (unknown)
 David Bell (unknown)
 Carmine Benincasa (unknown)
 John Broome (unknown)
 Noël Carroll (unknown)
 David Conway (unknown)
 Robert T. Craig (unknown)
 Jean Curthoys (unknown)
 Oliver Friggieri (unknown)
 James Heisig (unknown)
 Bensalem Himmich (unknown, born 1948?)
 Paul Horwich (unknown)
 Ole Fogh Kirkeby (unknown)
 Louise Lawler (unknown)
 David Loy (unknown)
 David Malament (unknown)
 Shkelzen Maliqi (unknown)
 Françoise Meltzer (unknown)
 Leonardo Moledo (unknown)
 Alun Munslow (unknown)
 David Papineau (unknown)
 Jean-Jacques Pelletier (unknown) 
 Mark de Bretton Platts (unknown)
 Vince Riolo (unknown)
 Alan Soble (unknown)
 Alfred I. Tauber (unknown)
 Xu Youyu (unknown)

Deaths 
 January 12 - George Chatterton-Hill (born 1883)
 January 22 - Vivienne Haigh-Wood Eliot (born 1888)
 January 28 - Morris Raphael Cohen (born 1880)
 February 24 - Pierre Janet (born 1859)
 May 8 - Cassius Jackson Keyser (born 1862)
 June 11 - Richard Hönigswald (born 1875)
 July - Léon Robin (born 1866)
 July 19 - Max Dessoir (born 1867)
 July 20 - Swami Vipulananda (born 1892)
 September 9 - Ananda Coomaraswamy (born 1877)
 September 22 - Pierre Lecomte du Noüy (born 1883)
 September 27 - Hans Cornelius (born 1863)
 October 4 - Max Planck (born 1858)
 December 13 - Nicholas Roerich (born 1874)
 December 23 - Ziauddin Ahmad (born 1878)
 December 30 - Alfred North Whitehead (born 1861)
 Maurice De Wulf
 Marcel Foucault
 Konstanty Michalski
 Harold Arthur Prichard

References 

 
Philosophy
20th-century philosophy
Philosophy by year